Cristhian Britos Rodríguez (born 7 September 1990) is an Uruguayan footballer who plays for Spanish club CF Lorca Deportiva as a midfielder.

References

External links

1990 births
Living people
Footballers from Montevideo
Uruguayan footballers
Association football midfielders
Uruguayan Primera División players
Uruguayan Segunda División players
Boston River players
Canadian Soccer Club players
Huracán F.C. players
Sud América players
Primera Nacional players
Club Atlético Tigre footballers
Crucero del Norte footballers
Segunda División B players
CF Lorca Deportiva players
Uruguayan expatriate footballers
Uruguayan expatriate sportspeople in Argentina
Uruguayan expatriate sportspeople in Spain
Expatriate footballers in Argentina
Expatriate footballers in Spain